Aconteceu, translated as It Happened, is the second album released by fado singer Ana Moura. It was released in 2004 by Mercury Records and Universal Music Portugal. AllMusic gave the album a rating of three stars. Reviewer Jeff Tamarkin wrote: "[N]early every song on Ana Moura's divine, alluring second album finds the singer heartbreaking. . . . In a full-bodied, commanding voice, . . . Moura . . . deftly displays the requisite over-the-top emotion of fado, sounding utterly natural doing so."

Track listing
Disc One
 "Por Um Dia" (Jorge Fernando) [3:35]	
 "Ao Poeta Perguntei" [2:07]
 "O Que Foi Que Aconteceu" [3:39]
 "Ouvi Dizer Que Me Esqueceste" (Jorge Fernando) [3:26]
 "Fado de Pessoa" [3:44]
 "Amor de Uma Noite" (Jorge Fernando) [3:13]
 "Eu Quero" (Júlio Vieitas) [3:02]
 "Bailinho à Portuguesa" [2:41]
 "Creio" (Jorge Fernando) [2:00]
 "Através Do Teu Coração" [2:41]

Disc Two
 "Como O Tempo Corre" [2:59]
 "Hoje Tudo Me Entristece" (Jorge Fernando) [3:10]
 "Passos Na Rua" (Carlos Manuel) [3:01]
 "Mouraria" [2:17]
 "Fado Menor" (Santos Moreira) [3:38]
 "Dentro da Tempestade" [3:01]
 "Cumplicidade" (Jorge Fernando) [2:15]
 "Ó Meu Amigo João" (Fado Corrido, Jorge Fernando) [2:22]
 "Venho Falar Dos Meus Medos" [3:00]
 "Nada Que Devas Saber" (Francisco Viana) [3:12]

References

Ana Moura albums
2004 albums
Portuguese-language albums
Mercury Records albums